The Cinema of Manipur  is the film industry based in Manipur, India. It includes not only Meitei language movies but all the films made in different languages of the different communities in Manipur. The Manipuri film industry was born  when Matamgi Manipur was released on 9 April 1972. Before this, there were many attempts to make a film in the state, the most significant being Mainu Pemcha in 1948 which was left incomplete due to various problems.

The tradition of documentary film making in Manipur was said to have been pioneered by the late Maharaj Kumar Priya Brata Singh who shot "actuality movies" with his 8 mm camera in 1936.

Paokhum Ama, released in 1983, was the first Manipuri colour film (short feature). Langlen Thadoi (1984) was the first Manipuri full-length colour feature film. Lammei (2002) was the first Manipuri video film to have a commercial screening at a theatre.

As the production of video films gained momentum, the Manipuri film industry expanded and around 80 to 100 films were made each year, becoming the largest film industry in North East India by number of films produced per year. There has been a decline in the production of films in the recent years.

Notable feature films: 1972-2022 
This section covers notable Manipuri feature films released between 9 April 1972 and 9 April 2022. Notable films, in this context, include those films which have participated or won awards in national and international film festivals, and the films which have made history (for example, first full-length film, first filmmaker, first colour film, longest movie).

Notable non-feature films: 1972-2022 
This section covers notable Manipuri non-feature films released between 9 April 1972 and 9 April 2022, with Maipak: Son of Manipur being the exception in the categorisation (released in 1971). Notable films, in this context, include those films which have participated in or won awards in national and international film festivals, and the films which have made history (for example, first full-length film, first filmmaker, first colour film, longest movie).

Notable non-feature films: 2022-2072 
This section covers notable Manipuri non-feature films released between 9 April 2022 and 9 April 2072.

See also 
 R. K. Bidur Singh

References

External links 
 Manipuri Film | Manipuri Movies | Manipuri Cinema | Manipuri Film Songs| Manipuri Movies Songs Mp3 | Manipur Video
 Manipuri Cinema

 
Cinema by language of India